Atlantic Avenue is a proposed Tri-Rail Coastal Link Green Line and Red Line station in Pompano Beach, Florida.

References

External links
 Proposed site in Google Maps Street View

Pompano Beach, Florida
Broward County, Florida
Proposed Tri-Rail stations